Frederick Charles Draper (born 13 February 2004) is an English professional footballer who plays as a forward for Drogheda United on loan from Lincoln City.

Club career

Lincoln City
Freddie Draper joined the Imps as a first-year scholar from Derby County. He signed his first professional contract on his 17th birthday, signing a three-year deal. He would make his Lincoln City debut against Sheffield Wednesday on 23 October 2021 coming off the bench to replace Anthony Scully. On 11 February 2022, he would join Gainsborough Trinity on loan until the end of the season. On 14 April 2022, he received his nomination for LFE Apprentice of the Season at the 2022 EFL Awards, joined by Deji Elerewe and Michael Williams Following the end 2021-22 season, Draper would be named Lincoln City's Academy Player of the season at the end of season awards.

The following season, Draper signed a new long-term contract at the club. The following month he would score his first professional goal after coming off the bench against Newscastle United U21 in the EFL Trophy. On 31 January 2023, he joined Drogheda United on loan for the season along with teammate Elicha Ahui.

Career statistics

References 

Living people
Lincoln City F.C. players
Gainsborough Trinity F.C. players
Drogheda United F.C. players
Association football forwards
2004 births
English footballers
League of Ireland players
Expatriate association footballers in the Republic of Ireland